The Complete Book of Dwarves is a supplemental rulebook for the 2nd edition of the Advanced Dungeons & Dragons fantasy role-playing game, published in 1991 by TSR, Inc. It contains a variety of information useful to playing dwarf characters in the game, including information on strongholds, dwarven subraces, character "kits", role-playing, mining, and more. The book was later reprinted in November 1993, with a slightly different cover.

Contents
The Complete Book of Dwarves contains an introduction, 11 chapters, and a number of character sheets designed for use by players with dwarf player characters. It is split into the following chapters:

 "The Creation of Dwarves: The book's first chapter discusses the creation of dwarves in the Dungeons & Dragons world and dwarven myths regarding the creation of the world, as well as information on the dwarven afterlife.
 "The Dwarf Subraces": This chapter describes the six main subraces of dwarves: hill dwarves, mountain dwarves, deep dwarves, sundered dwarves, duergar (also known as gray dwarves), and gully dwarves. This chapter does not contain information on the statistics for the various subraces, focusing instead on the thematic differences between the subraces.
 "Your Life as a Dwarf": The third chapter of the book examines dwarven culture and lifestyle, including information on their clans, view of the world, emotions, diet, marriage, and life cycle.
 "Character Creation": This chapter contains information on how to create dwarf characters, including statistics for the various subraces and rules regarding maximum levels, ability score modifiers, movement, and age.
 "Proficiencies": The fifth chapter has rules on new and expanded proficiencies, with an eye towards their use by dwarves.
 "Dwarf Kits": The longest chapter in the book, this section describes 24 "character kits" designed for dwarf characters, allowing players to further customize their characters.
 "Role Playing and Personalities": The seventh chapter describes various "personalities" which can help players roleplay dwarf characters. Personalities include The Grumbler, The Optimist, and The Phobic.
 "Mining": Chapter eight contains rules on mining, including how to survey the land, what products can be mined, and how much gold can be earned by mining.
 "Equipment": This chapter includes new equipment, such as smelters, battleaxes, and war machines.
 "Dwarf Strongholds": The book's tenth chapter discusses dwarven strongholds, including the various types of strongholds, their government, resources they have access to, and relationships with other races.
 "Designing Dwarf Campaigns": The final chapter is for Dungeon Masters creating a dwarf-based campaign. It contains guidelines on what dwarf subraces to use, dwarven mythology, campaign environments, and rules on how to create new character kits.

The Complete Book of Dwarves also contains "design sheets," for use designing new dwarf strongholds and kits, and "character sheets," designed for dwarves of each class.

Publication history
Design was by Jim Bambra, and Doug Stewart was the editor. The book featured interior art by Brom, Clyde Caldwell, Larry Elmore, Keith Parkinson, and Karl Waller.

Reception

See also
Races of Stone

References

Dungeons & Dragons sourcebooks
Dwarves in popular culture
Role-playing game supplements introduced in 1991